Mill Township is one of thirteen townships in Grant County, Indiana, United States. As of the 2010 census, its population was 10,882 and it contained 4,809 housing units.

Geography
The streams of Bean Run, City Run, Ethel Run, Long Branch, Octain Creek, Regular Run and Shell Run run through this township.

Cities and towns
 Gas City (south three-quarters)
 Marion (southeast edge)
 Jonesboro

Adjacent townships
 Center Township (north)
 Monroe Township (east)
 Jefferson Township (southeast)
 Fairmount Township (south)
 Liberty Township (southwest)
 Franklin Township (west)

Cemeteries
The township contains two cemeteries: Riverside and Walnut Creek.

Major highways

Education
Mill Township residents may obtain a library card from the Gas City-Mill Township Public Library in Gas City.

References

 U.S. Board on Geographic Names (GNIS)
 United States Census Bureau cartographic boundary files

External links
 Indiana Township Association
 United Township Association of Indiana

Townships in Grant County, Indiana
Townships in Indiana